The Pound Baronetcy, of Stanmore in the County of Middlesex, is a title in the Baronetage of the United Kingdom. It was created on 3 August 1905 for John Pound, then head of luggage manufacturers John Pound and Co. and also chairman of the London General Omnibus Company, who served as Lord Mayor of London from 1904 to 1905.

Pound baronets, of Stanmore (1905)
Sir John Pound, 1st Baronet (1829–1915)
Sir (John) Lulham Pound, 2nd Baronet (1862–1937)
Sir Allen Leslie Pound, 3rd Baronet (1888–1952)
Sir Derek Allen Pound, 4th Baronet (1920–1980)
Sir John David Pound, 5th Baronet (born 1946)

Notes

References
Kidd, Charles, Williamson, David (editors). Debrett's Peerage and Baronetage (1990 edition). New York: St Martin's Press, 1990,

External links

Pound